Gangs of Filmistaan is a Hindi stand-up comedy show that is broadcast on Star Bharat and digitally available on Disney+ Hotstar. The show stars stand-up comedian Sunil Grover, Shilpa Shinde and other actors. This show is produced by Preeti Simoes and Neeti Simoes under banner of Lil Frodo Productions house.

Premise 
The show is based on Bhindi Bhai, who is a don. The don gave his house on rent. But instead of taking rent, he asks them to entertain him.

Cast 

 Sunil Grover as Bhindi Bhai, a don
 Shilpa Shinde
 Sugandha Mishra
 Sanket Bhosale
 Paritosh Tripathi
 Upasana Singh
 Jatinder Suri
 Siddharth Sagar
 Devoleena Bhattacharjee
 Mohammad Nazim
 Anup Jalota
 Shakti Kapoor

See also 
 List of programs broadcast by Star Bharat

References

External links 
  
 
 Gangs of Filmistaan on Hotstar

2020 Indian television series debuts
Indian comedy television series
Star Bharat original programming